The 2022 Spielberg Formula 3 round was a motor racing event held on 9 and 10 July 2022 at the Red Bull Ring, Spielberg, Austria. It was the fifth round of the 2022 FIA Formula 3 Championship, and was held in support of the 2022 Austrian Grand Prix.

Driver changes 
The only driver change took part at MP Motorsport as Alexander Smolyar returned to the grid after being replaced by Euroformula Open driver Filip Ugran in Silverstone due to visa problems, preventing him from entering the United Kingdom.

Classification

Qualifying
Hitech Grand Prix driver Isack Hadjar achieved his maiden pole position by 0.221 seconds ahead of fellow Frenchman and championship leader Victor Martins, and Oliver Bearman.

Notes:
 – Zdeněk Chovanec was not able to set a time within the 107% time, but was later given permission by the stewards to start both the Sprint Race and the Feature Race from the back of the grid.

Sprint Race 

Notes:
 – Oliver Bearman originally finished sixth, but was given a five-second time-penalty for repeatedly exceeding track limits.

Feature race 
Isack Hadjar took his third victory of the season and his first Feature Race win in Formula 3 to close the gap in the championship to Victor Martins to only one point. However, Martins set a new record for the most podium finishes in F3 with eleven, more than any other driver. 

Notes:
 – Roman Staněk originally finished sixth, but was later given a five-second time-penalty for causing a collision with Kaylen Frederick, demoting him to eleventh place and subsequently dropping him out of the points.
 – Francesco Pizzi received a total time-penalty of twenty seconds for twice causing a collision with teammate Zdeněk Chovanec.
 – Kush Maini and Caio Collet retired, but were classified as they completed over 90% of the race distance.
 – Following a medical examination, Hunter Yeany was declared unfit for Sunday's Feature Race due to a broken wrist sustained at the Sprint Race and therefore withdrew from the remainder of the weekend.

Standings after the event 

Drivers' Championship standings

Teams' Championship standings

 Note: Only the top five positions are included for both sets of standings.

See also 
 2022 Austrian Grand Prix
 2022 Spielberg Formula 2 round

Notes

References

External links 
 Official website

|- style="text-align:center"
|width="35%"|Previous race:
|width="30%"|FIA Formula 2 Championship2022 season
|width="40%"|Next race:

Spielberg
Spielberg
July 2022 sports events in Austria